Zhang Rongming (born June 1944) is a Chinese politician, who served as the vice chairperson of the Chinese People's Political Consultative Conference.

References 

Living people
1944 births
Vice Chairpersons of the National Committee of the Chinese People's Political Consultative Conference